During the 1943–44 English football season, Brentford competed in the Football League South, due to the cessation of competitive football for the duration of the Second World War. The Bees marginally improved on the previous season's 9th-place finish, ending in 7th.

Season summary 
Brentford returned for the 1943–44 Football League South season again with a shortage of first team players, with just 10 available who made a senior appearance for the club prior to the outbreak of the Second World War in September 1939. The biggest boost for the squad came with the availability of goalkeeper Joe Crozier, who had not appeared since 21 October 1939. Reserve forwards Fred Durrant and Bob Thomas, signed before the war, would feature during the season, as would six junior and amateur players on the club's books. A whopping 36 guest players would be used during the campaign.

Despite an improved 7th-place finish in the Football League South, 1943–44 proved to be as forgettable as the previous season, though there were a few memorable results – 7–2 versus Southampton on 18 December 1943, 4–1 versus Arsenal in front of 20,270 at Griffin Park on 4 February 1944 and 8–0 versus Brighton & Hove Albion a month later in the group stage of the Football League War Cup, from which Brentford failed to qualify for the knockout stages. Three players won wartime international caps during the season – Les Smith for England, Joe Crozier for Scotland and Idris Hopkins for Wales. Though he finished the season as second-leading scorer behind guest Douglas Hunt, Les Smith's 15 goals in 15 appearances led his case for a first international cap in over two years.

The 1943–44 season ended with the retirements of two players who had contributed to Brentford's rise from the Third Division South to the First Division between 1932 and 1935. 34-year-old centre half Joe James elected to retire six months after failing to recover from a wrist injury suffered in the match versus Charlton Athletic on 26 February 1944. He would return to football briefly with Colchester United in November 1945. 35-year-old centre forward Jack Holliday, who moved to the half back line in his later years, retired at the end of the season, having scored 122 goals in 222 matches from his arrival in May 1932 to the outbreak of war in September 1939. He remained on the club's books as assistant trainer of the reserve team.

League table

Results 
 Brentford's goal tally listed first.

Legend

Football League South

Football League South War Cup 

 Source: 100 Years Of Brentford

Playing squad 
 Players' ages are as of the opening day of the 1943–44 season.

 Sources: Timeless Bees, Football League Players' Records 1888 to 1939, 100 Years Of Brentford

Coaching staff

Statistics

Appearances and goals 

 Players listed in italics left the club mid-season.
 Source: 100 Years Of Brentford

Goalscorers 

 Players listed in italics left the club mid-season.
 Source: 100 Years Of Brentford

Wartime international caps

Management

Summary

Transfers & loans 
 Guest players' arrival and departure dates correspond to their first and last appearances of the season.

References 

Brentford F.C. seasons
Brentford